Bangladesh Police Academy (BPA) is a 111-year-old police training institute. It is the Alma Mater of police training in Bangladesh. It is located 20 miles from Rajshahi City.

Location

Bangladesh Police Academy is located at Sardah under Charghat police station in Rajshahi district.

Evolution
The necessity for imparting formal training to policemen was first felt in Bengal in 1893 when an experimental course of instruction limited to a period of 12 months was tried at Mill Barrack in Dhaka. The experimentation however proved positive. In the meantime, the Indian Police Commission of 1902 also recommended establishment of a Provincial Training College. So, the Police Training School at Mill Barrack, Dhaka, was transformed into Provincial Institution in 1906. On annulment of the short-lived partition of Bengal in 1911, the existing Police Training College for Bengal, Bihar, Orissa and Assam at Bhagalpur (India) went to the province of the reorganized Bihar and Orissa. As such the need for a Police Training College for the province of Bengal and Assam was felt immediately. It was not possible to run the college in Dhaka for want of adequate accommodation, proper environment and also for its non-proximity from the capital city of Calcutta. So the authorities concerned thought of setting up a Police Training College at a better site having a bigger area. In July 1912, the college was established at Sardah to meet police training requirements in Bengal and Assam, which later in 1962 was declared as Police Academy, by the then president Field Marshal Ayub Khan who was visiting the academy as Chief Guest in its Golden Jubily. In 2007 it is again renamed Bangladesh Police Academy.

Historical background
Major H. Chamney who was selected to be the first principal of the reorganized Bengal Police Training College was an army officer, serving at Ghazipur (India) at that time. In those days, there was a regular passenger steamer service between Ghazipur and Calcutta run by Indian Navigation and Railway Company. Legends say that while traveling to Calcutta by this river route, Major Chamney once stopped at Charghat-which was then a steamer station-and was fascinated by the beauty of Sardah with a large open field and massive buildings of Dutch and English indigo planters. These were then being used as the Katcheries of the Midnapur Zaminderi Estate. Major H. Chamney thought this place suitable for establishment of a Police Training College. He immediately reported the matter to the Govt. and his proposal was accepted. The entire property, comprising an area of 242.66 acres of land with all its installations, was then purchased by the Government from Midnapur Zamindari Estate at an amount of only Tk. 25,000. It was thus destined to become the site for the planned Police Training College.

Courses offered

Basic courses

Refreshers’ courses

Specialized courses

List of principals

See also
Sardah chhota kuthi

References

Law enforcement in Bangladesh
Vocational education in Bangladesh
Bangladesh Police
1912 establishments in India
Police academies in Bangladesh